A semi-field study or semifield study is a type of scientific investigation which is intermediate between laboratory study and open field research. This may be in a large enclosure in a lab, mixing some of the greater space of a field with the greater control, difficulty of escape, ease of access, predictable environment, and lowered chance of accidental escape of the lab; or an enclosure in a field, combining the realistic biotic and abiotic features of the field environment with some of the difficulty of escape of the lab setting.

Regulation
Semi-field studies are sometimes encouraged - directly and indirectly - by legislation which prohibits non-target effects of pesticides. For example, although arthropods are common legitimate targets, honey bees are widely agreed to be beneficial to humans and often protected.

References

Further reading
 

Research
Field research
Biology experiments